The eastern violet-backed sunbird (Anthreptes orientalis), also known as the Kenya violet-backed sunbird, is a species of bird in the family Nectariniidae.
It is found in arid savanna of East Africa, ranging from Djibouti in north to Tanzania in south. It is part of the violet-backed sunbird superspecies.

References

eastern violet-backed sunbird
Birds of East Africa
eastern violet-backed sunbird
Taxonomy articles created by Polbot